Sam Smelt (born 23 August 1996) is a British racing driver, who competes in the British Touring Car Championship with Toyota Gazoo Racing. This is his second spell in the championship having last competed in 2018 with AmD Tuning. He previously raced in the VW Racing Cup and F4 British Championship both in 2017 and in karting before that season. He competed in British GT in 2019.

British GT Championship 
Smelt drove with ex-BTCC driver Árón Taylor-Smith in a Ford Mustang GT4. They finished 22nd in the championship with only 4 points, scored at Snetterton.

Racing record

Complete British Touring Car Championship results
(key) (Races in bold indicate pole position – 1 point awarded just in first race; races in italics indicate fastest lap – 1 point awarded all races; * signifies that driver led race for at least one lap – 1 point given all races)

Complete British GT Championship results
(key) (Races in bold indicate pole position) (Races in italics indicate fastest lap)

References

External links
 

1996 births
Living people
British Touring Car Championship drivers
English racing drivers
British racing drivers
British GT Championship drivers

Toyota Gazoo Racing drivers
British F4 Championship drivers